Sherfane Eviston Rutherford (born 15 August 1998) is a Guyanese cricketer. He made his international debut for the West Indies in December 2018.

Domestic and T20 career
Rutherford made his first-class debut for Guyana in the 2016–17 Regional Four Day Competition on 15 April 2017. He made his List A debut for Guyana in the 2017–18 Regional Super50 on 31 January 2018.

In June 2018, Rutherford was named in the Cricket West Indies B Team squad for the inaugural edition of the Global T20 Canada tournament. He was the leading run-scorer in the tournament for the Cricket West Indies B Team, with 230 runs in eight matches.

Rutherford made his Twenty20 debut for Guyana Amazon Warriors in the 2018 Caribbean Premier League on 9 August 2018.

In October 2018, Rutherford was named in the squad for the Khulna Titans team, following the draft for the 2018–19 Bangladesh Premier League. In December 2018, he was bought by the Delhi Capitals in the player auction for the 2019 Indian Premier League.

In June 2019, Rutherford was selected to play for the Edmonton Royals franchise team in the 2019 Global T20 Canada tournament. In November 2019, he was selected to play for the Sylhet Thunder in the 2019–20 Bangladesh Premier League. In July 2020, he was named in the Guyana Amazon Warriors squad for the 2020 Caribbean Premier League.

On 11 September 2021, Rutherford was included in the Sunrisers Hyderabad squad for the second phase of the 2021 IPL as a replacement player for Jonny Bairstow. In February 2022, he was bought by the Royal Challengers Bangalore in the auction for the 2022 Indian Premier League tournament. In July 2022, he was signed by the Galle Gladiators for the third edition of the Lanka Premier League.

International career
In October 2018, Rutherford was named in the West Indies' Twenty20 International (T20I) squad for series against India, but he did not play. In December 2018, he was again named in the West Indies' T20I squad, this time for their series against Bangladesh. He made his T20I debut for the West Indies against Bangladesh on 22 December 2018.

References

External links
 

1998 births
Living people
West Indies Twenty20 International cricketers
Delhi Capitals cricketers
Guyanese cricketers
Guyana cricketers
Guyana Amazon Warriors cricketers
Khulna Tigers cricketers
Karachi Kings cricketers
Peshawar Zalmi cricketers
Colombo Stars cricketers
Royal Challengers Bangalore cricketers